The Southern California Gas Company Complex is a group of buildings on Flower Street in Downtown Los Angeles.  The main building, completed in 1925, was designed in the Renaissance Revival style by John and Donald Parkinson.

It was originally used as offices by the Southern California Gas Company, but was later converted to lofts.

The six story extension at 820 S. Flower Street was designed by Robert V. Derrah in the Art Deco architecture style in 1942.  The two concrete side sections curve into a recessed glass center.

The buildings were added to the National Register of Historic Places in 2004.

See also
 National Register of Historic Places listings in Los Angeles, California

References

1920s architecture in the United States
1925 establishments in California
Buildings and structures in Downtown Los Angeles
Commercial buildings on the National Register of Historic Places in Los Angeles
John and Donald Parkinson buildings
Los Angeles Historic-Cultural Monuments
Office buildings completed in 1925
Office buildings in Los Angeles
Renaissance Revival architecture in California
Residential buildings in Los Angeles